Yi Ho-hyok was a North Korean politician (Communist).

She served as Minister of Foodstuff and Daily Necessities Industries 1967-1972.

References

20th-century North Korean women politicians
20th-century North Korean politicians
Year of birth missing (living people)
Place of birth missing (living people)
Women government ministers of North Korea